Željko Knapić (born 26 March 1957 in Čakovec) is a retired Croatian sprinter who represented former Yugoslavia in the 400 metres. He competed at the 1980 Summer Olympics in the 4 × 400 metres relay without qualifying for the final. In addition, he won two medals at the Mediterranean Games. He still holds Croatian records in the 200 and 400 metres.

International competitions

Personal bests
Outdoor
200 metres – 20.76 (0.0 m/s, Sarajevo 1981) NR
400 metres – 45.64 (Sarajevo 1981) NR
Indoor
200 metres – 21.40 (Vienna 1983)
400 metres – 46.56 (Vienna 1988)

References

All-Athletics profile

1957 births
Living people
Sportspeople from Čakovec 
Croatian male sprinters
Yugoslav male sprinters
Olympic athletes of Yugoslavia
Athletes (track and field) at the 1980 Summer Olympics
Mediterranean Games silver medalists for Yugoslavia
Mediterranean Games bronze medalists for Yugoslavia
Mediterranean Games medalists in athletics
Athletes (track and field) at the 1979 Mediterranean Games
Athletes (track and field) at the 1983 Mediterranean Games